The Jenerators are a blues rock band based in Los Angeles, California featuring Tom Hebenstreit on vocals, electric guitars and keyboards; Bill Mumy on vocals, acoustic and electric guitars, harmonica, keyboards, and percussion; Gary Stockdale on vocals and bass; Miguel Ferrer on vocals, percussion and drums; David Jolliffe on guitar, percussion and vocals and Chris Ross on drums and percussion.

External links
   official website

American blues rock musical groups
Musical groups from Los Angeles
Rock music groups from California